Domovina (in Czech: Homeland) is a modernist building in Prague 7-Holešovice. It was built between 1919 and 1922 to house a co-operative of railway workers and conductors. The building was designed by Otto V. Máca a Karel Roštík and is listed as a cultural monument of the Czech Republic.

On 18 to 23 February 1929, a congress of the Communist Party of Czechoslovakia took place in the Domovina hall. Klement Gottwald was elected the chairman of the party. On the facade, there is a plaque commemorating this event.

References 

Buildings and structures in Prague
Buildings and structures completed in 1921
Modernist architecture in the Czech Republic
1921 establishments in Czechoslovakia